The Wanjii Hydroelectric Power Station is a  hydroelectric power station  in Kenya.

Location
The coordinates of Wanjii Power Station are: 0°44'58.0"S, 37°10'29.0"E (Latitude:-0.749437; Longitude:37.174731).

Overview
The power station draws its waters from the Mathioya River and the Maragwa River  stored in the Wanjii Reservoir on the Maragwa River.

Ownership
Wanjii Hydroelectric Power Station is owned by Kenya Electricity Generating Company, a parastatal company of the government of Kenya.

See also

List of power stations in Kenya

References

External links
Upgrading Of Wanjii Power Station Civil Works In Kenya - 10 December 2013

Hydroelectric power stations in Kenya
Dams in Kenya
Dams completed in 1952
Energy infrastructure completed in 1952
Murang'a County